Pietro Balestra (c. 1672 – after 1729) was an Italian sculptor of the late-Baroque period. He was born in Siena, and was best known for his work in marble in Dresden, including a Meleager slaying the Calydonian Boar; Venus and Cupid, and Boreas and the Rape of Orithyia.

References 

 

17th-century Italian sculptors
Italian male sculptors
18th-century Italian sculptors
Italian Baroque sculptors
People from Siena
1670s births
Year of birth uncertain
Year of death unknown
18th-century Italian male artists